Nilamber Saha (born 18 May 1973) is an Indian former cricketer. He played two first-class matches for Bengal between 1998 and 2000.

See also
 List of Bengal cricketers

References

External links
 

1973 births
Living people
Indian cricketers
Bengal cricketers
Cricketers from Kolkata